Pleasant Hill is an unincorporated community in Newton County, Arkansas, United States.

References

Unincorporated communities in Newton County, Arkansas
Unincorporated communities in Arkansas